Diaphorinae is a subfamily of flies in the family Dolichopodidae.

Genera
Nematoproctus Loew, 1857 (Diaphorinae or Rhaphiinae)
Nurteria Dyte & Smith, 1980 (may belong in Sympycninae)
†Palaeoargyra Meunier, 1895
Phasmaphleps Bickel, 2005
†Prochrysotus Meunier, 1907
Terpsimyia Dyte, 1975
Urodolichus Lamb, 1922 (Diaphorinae or Rhaphiinae)
Tribe Diaphorini Schiner, 1864
Achradocera Becker, 1922
Aphasmaphleps Grichanov, 2010
Arabshamshevia Naglis, 2014
Asyndetus Loew, 1869
Chrysotus Meigen, 1824
Cryptophleps Lichtwardt, 1898
Diaphorus Meigen, 1824
Dubius Wei, 2012
Emiratomyia Naglis, 2014
Falbouria Dyte, 1980
Lyroneurus Loew, 1857 (sometimes a subgenus of Diaphorus, possibly a synonym of Chrysotus)
Melanostolus Kowarz, 1884
Ostenia Hutton, 1901
Shamshevia Grichanov, 2012
Trigonocera Becker, 1902
Tribe Argyrini Negrobov, 1986
Argyra Macquart, 1834
Dactylonotus Parent, 1934
Keirosoma Van Duzee, 1929
Pseudargyra Van Duzee, 1930
Somillus Brèthes, 1924
Symbolia Becker, 1922

References

 
Dolichopodidae subfamilies
Taxa named by Ignaz Rudolph Schiner